The 2024 Summer Paralympics, commonly known as the Games of the XVII Paralympiad, and commonly known as Paris 2024, is an upcoming international multi-sport parasports event governed by the International Paralympic Committee, to be held in Paris, France, from 28 August to 8 September 2024. These games mark the first time Paris will host the Paralympics in its history and the second time that France will host the Paralympic Games, as Tignes and Albertville joint hosted the 1992 Winter Paralympics. The final decision was made by the IOC on 13 September 2017, at their annual session in Lima, Peru.

Bids

As part of a formal agreement between the International Paralympic Committee and the International Olympic Committee first established in 2001, the winner of the bid for the 2024 Summer Olympics must also host the 2024 Summer Paralympics.

Due to concerns over a number of cities withdrawing in the bid process of the 2022 Winter Olympics and 2024 Summer Olympics, a process to award the 2024 and 2028 Games simultaneously to the final two cities in the running to the 2024 Summer Olympics—Los Angeles and Paris—was approved at an Extraordinary IOC Session on 11 July 2017 in Lausanne. Paris was understood to be the preferred host for the 2024 Games. On 31 July 2017, the IOC announced Los Angeles as the sole candidate for the 2028 Games, opening Paris up to be confirmed as hosts for the 2024 Games. Both decisions were ratified at the 131st IOC Session on 13 September 2017.

In February 2018, it was reported that the IOC and organizing committee had discussed moving the Olympics and Paralympics ahead by one week from their original scheduling, so that the Paralympics will fall within the school holiday period.

Sports 

The programme for the 2024 Summer Paralympics was announced in January 2019, with no changes to the 22 sports from the 2020 Summer Paralympics.

The IPC considered bids for golf, karate, para dance sport, and powerchair football to be added to the Paralympic programme. Bids for were also made for CP football  and sailing, the two sports that had been dropped at the 2020 Summer Paralympics: while CP football was selected for consideration by the IPC, it was rejected due to a lack of reach in women's participation.

In January 2021, the International Wheelchair Basketball Federation (IWBF) was declared non-competent by the IPC for violations of its Athlete Classification Code, and the sport was dropped from the Paris 2024 programme. On 22 September 2021, the IPC conditionally reinstated wheelchair basketball following reforms made by the IWBF, subject to compliance measures.

In this way, the final number of events to be played in Paris 2024 will be 549 finals in 22 sports, or 10 more events than in 2020.

On July 8, 2022, the final version of the schedule was revealed: it was confirmed that the 2024 edition will be one day shorter than the 2020 edition for logistical reasons (many of the Tokyo 2020 events were held outside of Tokyo Metropolitan Region or in arenas very far from the Paralympic Village) There will be  a total of 271 events for men, 235 events for women, and 43 mixed or open events, with at least 1,859 athletes being women, nearly double what was available in Sydney 2000 (when 990 women participated in the Games), and also pointed out that this number may still increase, since 359 places are available for mixed events.

Participation 
*The following is a list of National Paralympic Committees who have at least one athlete who has qualified for the 2024 Paralympics.

Venues

All the Paralympic events will be held in and around Paris, including the suburbs of Saint-Denis and Versailles, & Vaires-sur-Marne which is just outside the city environs.

Grand Paris zone

Paris Centre zone

Versailles zone

Outlying venues

Non-competitive venues

Marketing

Emblem

The emblem for the 2024 Summer Olympics and Paralympics (a stylized rendition of Marianne) was unveiled on 21 October 2019 at the Grand Rex. For the first time, a Paralympic Games will share the same emblem as their corresponding Olympics, with no difference or variation. Paris 2024 president Tony Estanguet stated that the decision was intended to reflect the two events sharing a single "ambition", explaining that "in terms of legacy we believe that in this country we need to strengthen the place of sport in the daily life of the people, and whatever the age, whatever the disability or not, you have a place and a role to play in the success of Paris 2024".

Mascots

The Phryges, the hat-like mascots, was unveiled on 14 November 2022

Broadcasting 

In conjunction with the Olympic Games, the French national public television broadcaster France Télévisions acquired domestic and ultramarine  rights to the 2024 Summer Paralympics, airing primarily on their main channels France 2 and France 3.

On 28 August 2020, Channel 4 announced that it has extended its agreement with the International Paralympic Committee until Paris 2024.

See also

2024 Summer Olympics

References

External links
 Paris 2024 Official Homepage

 
Summer Paralympic Games
Summer Paralympics
Summer Paralympics
International sports competitions hosted by Paris
Summer Paralympics 2024
2020s in Paris
Multi-sport events in France
September 2024 sports events
2024 in disability sport